Madhukar Toradmal (24 July 1932 – 2 July 2017) was a Marathi actor, writer and professor who has acted in numerous Marathi dramas and movies. He was also a writer and translator. He translated over 20 plays. He has been associated with Marathi theatre since 1971 and till date has performed in 16 different plays and a variety of roles. He died on 2 July 2017 in Mumbai.

Career
He was better known as "Mama" in the Theater industry, as a matter of respect. He lost his father at the age of 10. His uncle was a police officer in Mumbai. His uncle took him to Mumbai and out in the Seth Anandila Potdar school. On the first day of school, he showed interest in a school play to his class teacher Jaykar Madam. Pratidnyapurto was his first play which he directed in the school. The play was written by Chi Vi Joshi. Later during his school and college days, he directed many plays.

After the school and college education, he joined as clerk in Premier Automobiles, Mumbai. Later in 1968, he moved to Ahmednagar and became a professor of English in a college in Ahmednagar. Toradmal quit his job to take the plunge into acting and straddled the world of Marathi theatre and cinema for more than five decades. He formed an organization called "Rasikranjan", dedicated to Marathi plays. He also played important roles in the plays of the organization like Natysampada, Natyamandar, The Goa Hindu Association etc.

He played a famous role in the play Tarun Turk Mhatare Ark, that he wrote and directed. More than 5000 shows were done. Initially the shows was projected as not suitable for high class ladies by the media. But this show was a great success. On 14 Jan 1972, the play made 3 shows in a single day at Balgandharv Ranga Mandir, Pune which was an all-time record that time. These shows were been attended by famous personalities like Bal Thackeray, Ga Di Madgulkar, Vasant Desai and many more.

He had done lot of writing, including novels like Tisari Ghanta, Uttarmamayan, etc.

Translation work
He translated many novels and plays into Marathi language. This includes a series called Buddhipramanyawad, by Dhondo Keshav Karve. This also includes translations of 27 novels of Agatha Christie from English to Marathi.

Stage appearances - Character name and play
 Aba (Bap Bilandar Beta Kalandar) आबा (बाप बिलंदर बेटा कलंदर)
 Akhercha Saval अखेरचा सवाल
 Bhovara भोवरा
 Indrasen Angre (Indrasen Angre) इंद्रसेन आंग्रे (काळे बेट लाल बत्ती)
 Daku (Sangharsh) डाकू (संघर्ष)
 Docter (Goodbye Docter) डॉक्टर (गुड बाय डॉक्टर)
 Docter Vishwamitra (Gosht Janmantarichi) डॉक्टर विश्वामित्र (गोष्ट जन्मांतरीची)
 Deenanath (Chandne SHimpit Ja) दीनानाथ (चांदणे शिंपीत जा)
 Dhanraj (Beiman) धनराज (बेईमान)
 Professor (Aashchary Number 10) प्रोफेसर (आश्चर्य नंबर दहा)
 Professor Bartakke (Tarun Turk Mhatare Ark) प्रोफेसर बारटक्के (तरुण तुर्क म्हातारे अर्क)
 Bahadursingh (Sainik Navacha Manus) बहादुरसिंग (सैनिक नावाचा माणूस)
 Barrister Devdatta (Akhercha Saval) बॅरिस्टर देवदत्त (अखेरचा सवाल)
 Bhishma (Matsygandha) भीष्म (मत्स्यगंधा)
 Mama (Soubhagy) मामा (सौभाग्य)
 Ramshstri (Mrugtrushna) रामशास्त्री (मृगतृष्णा)
 Lalya (Gharat Fulala Parijat) लाल्या (घरात फुलला पारिजात)
 Sarjan Kamat (Chafa Bolena) सर्जन कामत (चाफा बोलेना)

Filmography

 Aatmavishwas आत्मविश्वास (१९९३) -
 Aapli Manse आपली माणसे (१९९३) - ए.ए.मंगळकर
 Bala Gau Kashi Angai बाळा गाऊ कशी अंगाई (१९७७) - अनंत कान्हेरे
 Raakh राख (१९८९) - करमाळी शेठ
 Sinhasan सिंहासन (१९८०) - दौलतराव
 (Chandane Shimpit Jaa) चांदणे शिंपीत जा (1982)
Jyotibacha navas ज्योतिबा चा नवस

Television
 Sangharsh

Awards received
 2009-10 Jeevan Gaurav award by Maharashtra government 
 2012- Maharshtra Sahitya Parishad

Family
Toradmal was blessed with three daughters. One of the girls is Trupti Toradmal.

Death
Toradmal was found dead in his residence on 2 July 2017. Earlier, he was admitted to Asian Heat hospital but his condition was not improving. He was suffering from kidney failure. Maharashtra Chief Minister Devendra Fadnavis condoled his passing. "With his demise, we have lost a versatile and multi-talented personality who enriched Marathi theatre and cinema."

References

1932 births
2017 deaths
Male actors in Marathi theatre
Male actors in Marathi cinema
Indian male film actors
Male actors in Hindi cinema
Indian film score composers
20th-century Indian male actors
Male actors from Mumbai